NNVAV is the second studio album by Mexican singer Zemmoa, released digitally and on vinyl on 15 June 2015.

Background 
In 2015 Zemmoa presented her second album NNVAV (Nothing is going to beat us) produced by Yamil Rezc (Julieta Venegas, Zoé, Hello Seahorse!), Juan Soto, Renato del Real and Andrés Jaime (Wet Baes).

Track listing

Videos 

 Hombre De Hojalata
 Ciencia Ficción
 +D10

References 

2015 albums
Spanish-language albums